KNAK (540 AM) is a radio station which is currently silent, but previously broadcast a talk format. Licensed to serve Delta, Utah, United States, the station is currently owned by KYAH, LLC.

The then-KYAH's program schedule consisted of an assortment of religious and talk radio programs. KYAH went off the air on October 3, 2022, in anticipation of being sold. On October 13, 2022, James Feijo's DCO Holding, LLC filed an application with the FCC to sell KYAH to Patricia Feijo's KYAH, LLC for $100.00 and the cancellation of outstanding debt. A request for Special Temporary Authority (STA) for the station to remain silent was also filed with the FCC in conjunction with the sale application. The sale was consummated on December 13, 2022, at which point the station changed its call sign to KNAK.

References

External links

NAK (AM)
Talk radio stations in the United States
Radio stations established in 1974
1974 establishments in Utah
News and talk radio stations in the United States